The 1981–82 NBA season was the Rockets' 15th season in the NBA and 11th season in the city of Houston. The Rockets entered the season as runner-ups in the 1981 NBA Finals, having lost to the Boston Celtics in six games.

In the playoffs, the Rockets lost to the Seattle SuperSonics in three games in the First Round.

Draft picks

Roster

Regular season

Season standings

z – clinched division title
y – clinched division title
x – clinched playoff spot

Record vs. opponents

Game log

Regular season

|- align="center" bgcolor="#ccffcc"
| 1
| October 30, 1981
| @ Los Angeles
| W 113–112 (2OT)
|
|
|
| The Forum
| 1–0

|- align="center" bgcolor="#ffcccc"
| 7
| November 11, 1981
| Los Angeles
| L 93–95
|
|
|
| The Summit
| 2–5
|- align="center" bgcolor="#ffcccc"
| 13
| November 21, 1981
| @ Philadelphia
| L 106–135
|
|
|
| The Spectrum
| 6–7
|- align="center" bgcolor="#ffcccc"
| 17
| November 29, 1981
| @ Los Angeles
| L 104–122
|
|
|
| The Forum
| 6–11

|- align="center" bgcolor="#ccffcc"
| 43
| January 28, 1982
| Philadelphia
| W 109–101
|
|
|
| The Summit
| 21–22

|- align="center" bgcolor="#ffcccc"
| 68
| March 21, 1982
| @ Los Angeles
| L 102–107
|
|
|
| The Forum
| 36–32

|- align="center" bgcolor="#ffcccc"
| 76
| April 6, 1982
| Los Angeles
| L 97–108
|
|
|
| The Summit
| 43–33

Playoffs

|- align="center" bgcolor="#ffcccc"
| 1
| April 21
| @ Seattle
| L 87–102
| Moses Malone (20)
| Moses Malone (15)
| Tom Henderson (7)
| Kingdome14,071
| 0–1
|- align="center" bgcolor="#ccffcc"
| 2
| April 23
| Seattle
| W 91–70
| Moses Malone (28)
| Moses Malone (23)
| Allen Leavell (6)
| The Summit15,676
| 1–1
|- align="center" bgcolor="#ffcccc"
| 3
| April 25
| @ Seattle
| L 83–104
| Moses Malone (24)
| Moses Malone (13)
| Mike Dunleavy (5)
| Kingdome14,071
| 1–2
|-

Player statistics

Season

Playoffs

Awards and records
Moses Malone, NBA Most Valuable Player Award
Moses Malone, All-NBA First Team

Transactions
June 8, 1981: Traded a 1981 2nd round draft pick (Charles Davis) and a 1983 2nd round draft pick to the Washington Bullets for Elvin Hayes.

References

See also
1981–82 NBA season

Houston Rockets seasons
H